This is an incomplete list of Acts of the Parliament of Great Britain for the years 1707–1719. For Acts passed until 1707 see List of Acts of the Parliament of England and List of Acts of the Parliament of Scotland. See also the List of Acts of the Parliament of Ireland to 1700 and the List of Acts of the Parliament of Ireland, 1701–1800.

For Acts passed from 1801 onwards see List of Acts of the Parliament of the United Kingdom. For Acts of the devolved parliaments and assemblies in the United Kingdom, see the List of Acts of the Scottish Parliament, the List of Acts of the Northern Ireland Assembly, and the List of Acts and Measures of the National Assembly for Wales; see also the List of Acts of the Parliament of Northern Ireland.

The number shown after each Act's title is its chapter number. Acts are cited using this number, preceded by the year(s) of the reign during which the relevant parliamentary session was held; thus the Union with Ireland Act 1800 is cited as "39 & 40 Geo. 3 c. 67", meaning the 67th Act passed during the session that started in the 39th year of the reign of George III and which finished in the 40th year of that reign. Note that the modern convention is to use Arabic numerals in citations (thus "41 Geo. 3" rather than "41 Geo. III"). Acts of the last session of the Parliament of Great Britain and the first session of the Parliament of the United Kingdom are both cited as "41 Geo. 3".

Acts passed by the Parliament of Great Britain did not have a short title; however, some of these Acts have subsequently been given a short title by Acts of the Parliament of the United Kingdom (such as the Short Titles Act 1896).

Before the Acts of Parliament (Commencement) Act 1793 came into force on 8 April 1793, Acts passed by the Parliament of Great Britain were deemed to have come into effect on the first day of the session in which they were passed. Because of this, the years given in the list below may in fact be the year before a particular Act was passed.

1707–1709

1707 (6 Ann.)

| {{|Cathedral Statutes Act 1707|public|75|23-10-1707|note3=|repealed=y|archived=n|An Act for the avoiding of Doubts and Questions touching the Statutes of divers Cathedrals and Collegiate Churches.}}
| {{|Cestui que Vie Act 1707|public|72|23-10-1707|note3=|repealed=n|archived=n|An Act for the more effectual Discovery of the Death of Persons pretended to be alive to the prejudice of those who claim Estates after their Deaths.}}
| {{|City of London (Garbling of Spices and Admission of Brokers) Act 1707|public|68|23-10-1707|note3=|repealed=y|archived=n|An Act for repealing the Act of the first Year of King James the First, entitled An Act for the well garbling of spices; and for granting an Equivalent to the City of London by admitting Brokers}}
| {{|Coinage in American Plantations Act 1707|public|57|23-10-1707|note3=|repealed=y|archived=n|An Act for ascertaining the rates of foreign coins in her Majesty's plantations in America.}}
| {{|Duchy of Cornwall Act 1707|public|52|23-10-1707|note3=|repealed=y|archived=n|An Act to enable her Majesty to make leases and copies of offices, lands, and hereditaments, parcel of her duchy of Cornwall, or annexed to the same.}}
| {{|Duties on East India Goods Act 1707|note1=|public|37|note2= [Ruffhead c 3]|23-10-1707|note3=|repealed=y|archived=n|An Act for better Securing the Duties of East India Goods.}}
| {{|East India Company Act 1707|public|71|23-10-1707|note3=|repealed=y|archived=n|An Act for assuring to the English company trading to the East Indies, on account of the united stock, a longer time in the fund and trade therein mentioned, and for raising thereby the sum of twelve hundred thousand pounds for carrying on the war, and other her Majesty's occasions.}}
| {{|Equivalent Money Act 1707|public|51|23-10-1707|note3=|repealed=y|archived=n|An Act for the further directing the payment of the equivalent money.}}
| {{|Exchequer Court (Scotland) Act 1707|public|53|23-10-1707|note3=|repealed=n|archived=n|An Act for settling and establishing a Court of Exchequer in the north part of Great Britain called Scotland.}}
| {{|Exportation Act 1707|public|44|23-10-1707|note3=|repealed=y|archived=n|An Act for the exportation of white woollen cloth.}}
| {{|Forfeited Estates Act 1707|public|61|23-10-1707|note3=|repealed=y|archived=n|An Act for limiting a time to persons to come in and make their claims to any of the forfeited estates, and other interests in Ireland, sold by the trustees for sale of those estates to The Governor and Company for Making Hollow Sword Blades in England, and divers other purchasers.}}
| {{|Habeas Corpus Suspension Act 1707|public|67|23-10-1707|note3=|repealed=y|archived=n|An Act to impower her Majesty to secure and detain such persons as her Majesty shall suspect are conspiring against her person and government.}}
| {{|Highways Act 1707|public|56|23-10-1707|note3=|repealed=y|archived=n|An Act to repeal a clause in an act of the seventh year of the reign of his late Majesty (for amending and repairing the highways) which enjoins waggoners and others to draw with a pole between the wheel horses, or with double shafts, and to oblige them to draw only with six horses or other beasts except up hills.}}
| {{|Importation Act 1707|public|60|23-10-1707|note3=|repealed=y|archived=n|An Act for the importation of cochineal from any ports in Spain, during the present war, and six months longer.}}
| {{|Land Tax Act 1707|public|35|23-10-1707|note3=|repealed=y|archived=n|An Act for granting an aid to her Majesty, to be raised by a land tax in Great Britain, for the service of the year one thousand seven hundred and eight.}}
| {{|Militia Act 1707|note1=|public|63|note2=[Ruffhead c 36]|23-10-1707|note3=|repealed=y|archived=n|An Act for raising the Militia of this Kingdom for the Year One thousand seven hundred and eight although the Months Pay formerly advanced be not repaid.}}
| {{|Mischiefs from Fire Act 1707|public|58|23-10-1707|note3=|repealed=y|archived=n|An Act for the better preventing mischiefs that may happen by fire.}}
| {{|Mutiny Act 1707|public|74|23-10-1707|note3=|repealed=y|archived=n|An Act for continuing an act made in the third year of her Majesty's reign, intituled, An Act for punishing mutiny and desertion, and false musters, and for the better payment of the army and quarters.}}
| {{|Queen Anne's Bounty Act 1707|public|54|23-10-1707|note3=|repealed=y|archived=n|An Act to inlarge the time for returning the certificates of all ecclesiastical livings, not exceeding the yearly value of fifty pounds; as also for discharging all livings of that value from the payment of first-fruits; and for allowing time to archbishops and bishops, and other dignitaries, for payment of their first-fruits.}}
| {{|Recruiting Act 1707|public|45|23-10-1707|note3=|repealed=y|archived=n|An act for the better recruiting her Majesty's land forces and the marines, for the service of the year one thousand seven hundred and eight.}}
| {{|Repeal of Certain Scotch Acts 1707|public|36|23-10-1707|note3=|repealed=y|archived=n|An Act for repealing and declaring the determination of two acts passed in the parliament of Scotland; the one intituled, An Act for the security of the kingdom; the other, Act anent peace and war.}}
| {{|Scottish Representative Peers Act 1707|public|78|23-10-1707|note3=|repealed=y|archived=n|An Act to make further provision for electing and summoning sixteen peers of Scotland to sit in the house of peers in the parliament of Great Britain; and for trying peers for offences committed in Scotland; and for the further regulating of voters in elections of members to serve in parliament.}}
| {{|Security of the Sovereign Act 1707|note1= (Security of the Sovereign)|public|66|note2=[Ruffhead c 14]|23-10-1707|note3=|repealed=y|archived=n|An Act for the better security of her Majesty's person and government.}}
| {{|Security to Merchant Ships Act 1707|public|65|23-10-1707|note3=|repealed=y|archived=n|An Act for the better securing the trade of this kingdom by cruisers and convoys.}}
| {{|Succession to the Crown Act 1707|public|41|note2=[Ruffhead c 7]|23-10-1707|note3=|repealed=n|archived=n|An Act for the Security of Her Majesties Person and Government and of the Succession to the Crown of Great Britain in the Protestant Line.}}
| {{|Taxation Act 1707|public|38|23-10-1707|note3=|repealed=y|archived=n|An Act for charging and continuing the duties upon malt, mum, cyder, and perry, for the service of the year one thousand seven hundred and eight.}}
| {{|Taxation Act 1707|public|39|23-10-1707|note3=|repealed=y|archived=n|An Act for raising a further supply to her Majesty for the service of the year one thousand seven hundred and eight, and other uses, by sale of annuities charged on a fund, not exceeding forty thousand pounds per annum, to arise by appropriating several surplusses and by granting further terms in the duties on low wines, and on hawkers, pedlars, and petty chapmen, the stamp duties, the one third subsidy, the duty on sweets, and one of the branches of excise, and by making other provision in this act mentioned.}}
| {{|Taxation Act 1707|public|48|23-10-1707|note3=|repealed=y|archived=n|}}
| {{|Taxation Act 1707|public|49|23-10-1707|note3=|repealed=y|archived=n|}}
| {{|Taxation Act 1707|public|50|23-10-1707|note3=|repealed=y|archived=n|}}
| {{|Taxation Act 1707|public|73|23-10-1707|note3=|repealed=y|archived=n|An Act for continuing the half subsidies therein mentioned, with several impositions and other duties, to raise money by way of loan, the service of the war, and other her Majesty's necessary and important occasions, and for charging of prize goods and seizures, and for taking off the drawbacks of foreign cordage, and to obviate the clandestine importation of wrought silks.}}
| {{|Tithes Act 1707|public|55|23-10-1707|note3=|repealed=y|archived=n|An Act for continuing the act for ascertaining the tithes of hemp and flax.}}
| {{|Trade to America Act 1707|public|64|23-10-1707|note3=|repealed=y|archived=n|An Act to explain the act of the last session of parliament, for the ease of her Majesty's subjects in relation to allowances out of the duties upon salt carried coastwise and also an act of the first year of her Majesty's reign, in relation to certain salt works near the sea-side and bay of Holy-head in the county of Anglesea.}}
| {{|Union with Scotland (Amendment) Act 1707|public|40|23-10-1707|note3=|maintained=n|archived=n|An Act for rendring the Union of the Two Kingdoms more entire and complete.}}
| {{|Woollen Cloths Act 1707|public|43|23-10-1707|note3=|repealed=y|archived=n|An Act for encouraging the dressing and dying of woollen clothes within this kingdom, by laying a duty upon broad cloth exported white.}}
| {{|Yorkshire (East Riding) Land Registry Act 1707|public|62|23-10-1707|note3=|repealed=y|archived=n|An Act for the publick registering of all deeds, conveyances, wills, and other incumbrances that shall be made of, or that may affect any honours, manors, lands, tenements, or hereditaments within the East Riding of the county of York, or the town and county of the town of Kingston upon Hull, after the nine and twentieth day of September, one thousand seven hundred and eighty and for the rendring the register in the West Riding more complete.}}

}}

1708 (7 Ann.)

| {{|Alteration of Terms in Scotland Act 1708|public|15|16-11-1708|note3=|repealed=y|archived=n|An Act for altering Whitsuntide and Lammas terms, for the Court of Exchequer in Scotland.}}
| {{|Bank of England Act 1708|public|30|16-11-1708|note3=|repealed=y|archived=n|An Act for enlarging the Capital Stock of the Bank of England.}}
| {{|Coinage Act 1708|public|24|16-11-1708|note3=|repealed=y|archived=n|}}
| {{|Commissions of Sewers Act 1708|public|33|16-11-1708|note3=|repealed=y|archived=n|An Act for rendring more effectual the Laws concerning Commissions of Sewers.}}
| {{|Commissioners of Sewers (City of London) Act 1708|public|9|16-11-1708|note3=|repealed=y|archived=n|An Act for giving the commissioners of sewers for the City of London the same powers as the commissioners of sewers for counties have; and to oblige collectors for the sewers to account.}}
| {{|Continuance of Certain Duties, etc. Act 1708|public|31|16-11-1708|note3=|repealed=y|archived=n|}}
| {{|Diplomatic Privileges Act 1708|public|12|16-11-1708|note3=|repealed=y|archived=n|An Act for preserving the Privileges of Ambassadors and other publick Ministers of Foreign Princes and States.}}
| {{|Foreign Protestants Naturalization Act 1708|public|5|16-11-1708|note3=|repealed=y|archived=n|An Act for naturalizing Foreign Protestants.}}
| {{|Fortifications Act 1708|public|26|16-11-1708|note3=|repealed=y|archived=n|}}
| {{|General Pardon Act 1708|public|22|16-11-1708|note3=|repealed=y|archived=n|}}
| {{|Land Tax Act 1708|public|1|16-11-1708|note3=|repealed=y|archived=n|An Act for granting an aid to her Majesty, to be raised by a land tax in Great Britain, for the service of the year one thousand seven hundred and nine.}}
| {{|Middlesex Registry Act 1708|public|20|16-11-1708|note3=|repealed=y|archived=n|An Act for the Public registring of Deeds Conveyances Wills and other Incumbrances which shall be made of or that may affect any Honors Manors Tenements or Hereditaments within the County of Middlesex after the Twenty-ninth day of September One thousand seven hundred and nine.}}
| {{|Militia Act 1708|public|23|16-11-1708|note3=|repealed=y|archived=n|}}
| {{|Mischiefs by Fire Act 1708|public|17|16-11-1708|note3=|repealed=y|archived=n|An Act for making more effectual an act made in the sixth year of her Majesty's reign, for the better preventing of mischiefs that may happen by fire.}}
| {{|Mutiny Act 1708|public|4|16-11-1708|note3=|repealed=y|archived=n|An Act for punishing mutiny and desertion, and false musters and for the better payment of the army and quarters.}}
| {{|Parochial Libraries Act 1708|public|14|16-11-1708|note3=|repealed=n|archived=n|An Act for the better Preservation of Parochial Libraries in England.}}
| {{|Perpetuation, etc., of Acts, 1708|public|25|16-11-1708|note3=|repealed=y|archived=n|}}
| {{|Recruiting Act 1708|public|2|16-11-1708|note3=|repealed=y|archived=n|An Act for the speedy and effectual recruiting her Majesty's land forces and marines, for the service of the year one thouland seven hundred and nine.}}
| {{|Salt Duties Act 1708|public|11|16-11-1708|note3=|repealed=y|archived=n|An Act for ascertaining and directing the payment of the allowances to be made for or upon the exportation from Scotland, of fish, beef, and pork, cured with foreign salt imported before the first day of May, one thousand seven hundred and seven; and for disposing such salt still remaining in the hands of her Majesty's subjects there; and for ascertaining and securing the allowances for fish and flesh exported, and to be exported from Scotland for the future.}}
| {{|Smithfield Market, etc. Act 1708|public|6|16-11-1708|note3=|repealed=y|archived=n|An Act for explaining and making more effectual that part of an act passed in the fifth year of her present Majesty's reign concerning the buying and selling of cattle in Smithfield, and for giving leave for bringing up calves dead to London as formerly.}}
| {{|Taxation Act 1708|public|3|16-11-1708|note3=|repealed=y|archived=n|An Act for charging and continuing the duties upon malt, mum, cyder, and perry, for the service of the year one thousand seven hundred and nine.}}
| {{|Treason Act 1708|public|21|16-11-1708|note3=|repealed=n|archived=n|An Act for improving the Union of the Two Kingdoms.}}
| {{|Trust or Mortgage Estates Act 1708|public|19|16-11-1708|note3=|repealed=y|archived=n|An Act to enable infants who are seized or possessed of estates in fee, in trust, or by way of mortgage, to make conveyances of such estates.}}
| {{|Wagers Act 1708|public|16|16-11-1708|note3=|repealed=y|archived=n|An Act to prevent the laying of wagers relating to the publick.}}
| {{|Woollen Cloth Act 1708|public|13|16-11-1708|note3=|repealed=y|archived=n|An Act for the better ascertaining the lengths and breadths of woollen cloth made in the County of York.}}
| {{|(7 Ann. c. 7)|public|7|16-11-1708|note3=|repealed=y|archived=n|An Act for enlarging the capital stock of the Bank of England, and for raising a further supply to her Majesty, for the service of the year one thousand seven hundred and nine.}}
| {{|(7 Ann. c. 8)|public|8|16-11-1708|note3=|repealed=y|archived=n|An Act for continuing several impositions and duties, to raise money by way of loan; and for exporting British copper and brass wire duty-free; and for circulating a further sum in Exchequer bills, in case a new contract be made in that behalf; and concerning the oaths to be administered in relation to Italian thrown silks, and touching oils and plantation goods of foreigners, taken or to be taken as prize; and concerning drugs of America to be imported from her Majesty's plantations; and for appropriating the monies given in the session of parliament; and for making out debentures for two transport ships in this act named; and to allow a further time for registered certain debentures, and for relief of persons who have lost such tickets, Exchequer bills, debentures, tallies, or orders, as in this act are mentioned.}}
}}

1709 (8 Ann.)

| {{|Catwater Harbour and Sutton Pool, Plymouth Act 1709|public|4|15-11-1709|note3=|repealed=y|archived=n|An Act for clearings preserving and maintaining the harbour of Cat-water, lying near Plymouth, in the county of Devon; and for the cleansing and keeping clean the pool commonly called Sutton Pool, lying in Plymouth aforesaid.}}
| {{|Circuit Courts (Scotland) Act 1709|public|6|15-11-1709|note3=|repealed=y|archived=n|An Act for discharging the Attendance of Noblemen, Barons, and Freeholders upon the Lords of Justiciary in their Circuits in that Part of Great Britain called Scotland, and for abolishing the Method of exhibiting criminal Informations by the Porteous Roll.}}
| {{|Copyright Act 1709|public|21|note2=Ruffhead c 19|15-11-1709|note3=|repealed=y|archived=n|An Act for the Encouragement of Learning, by Vesting the Copies of Printed Books in the Authors or Purchasers of such Copies, during the Times therein mentioned.}}
| {{|Eddystone Lighthouse Act 1709|public|17|15-11-1709|note3=|repealed=y|archived=n|}}
| {{|Exportation Act 1709|public|2|15-11-1709|note3=|repealed=y|archived=n|An Act to prohibit the exportation of corn, malt, meal, flour, bread, biscuit, and starch, and low wines, spirits, worts, and wash drawn from malted corn.}}
| {{|Exportation Act 1709|public|7|15-11-1709|note3=|repealed=y|archived=n|}}
| {{|Fortifications Act 1709|public|23|15-11-1709|note3=|repealed=y|archived=n|}}
| {{|Landlord and Tenant Act 1709|public|18|15-11-1709|note3=|repealed=n|archived=n|An Act for the better Security of Rents and to prevent Frauds committed by Tenants.}}
| {{|Liverpool Docks Act 1709|public|8|15-11-1709|note3=|repealed=y|archived=n|}}
| {{|Militia Act 1709|public|22|15-11-1709|note3=|repealed=y|archived=n|}}
| {{|Mutiny Act 1709|public|6|15-11-1709|note3=|repealed=y|archived=n|}}
| {{|Price and Assise of Bread Act 1709|public|19|15-11-1709|note3=|repealed=y|archived=n|}}
| {{|Recruiting Act 1709|public|13|15-11-1709|note3=|repealed=y|archived=n|}}
| {{|Security of the Sovereign Act 1709|public|15|15-11-1709|note3=|repealed=y|archived=n|}}
| {{|Silk Manufacturers Act 1709|public|11|15-11-1709|note3=|repealed=y|archived=n|}}
| {{|Stamps Act 1709|public|5|15-11-1709|note3=|repealed=y|archived=n|}}
| {{|Taxation Act 1709|public|3|15-11-1709|note3=|repealed=y|archived=n|An Act for charging and continuing the duties upon malt, mum, cyder, and perry, for the service of the year one thousand seven hundred and ten.}}
| {{|Taxation Act 1709|public|10|15-11-1709|note3=|repealed=y|archived=n|}}
| {{|Taxation Act 1709|public|12|15-11-1709|note3=|repealed=y|archived=n|}}
| {{|Taxation, etc. Act 1709|public|14|15-11-1709|note3=|repealed=y|archived=n|}}
}}

1710–1719

1710 (9 Ann.)

| {{|Assise of Fuel Act 1710|public|20|25-11-1710|note3=|repealed=y|archived=n|}}
| {{|Bank of England Act 1710|public|7|25-11-1710|note3=|repealed=y|archived=n|}}
| {{|Coal Trade Act 1710|public|30|25-11-1710|note3=|repealed=y|archived=n|}}
| {{|Game Act 1710|public|27|25-11-1710|note3=|repealed=y|archived=n|}}
| {{|Gaming Act 1710|public|19|25-11-1710|note3=|repealed=y|archived=n|An Act for better preventing of excessive and deceitful Gaming.}}
| {{|Highways Act 1710|public|23|25-11-1710|note3=|repealed=y|archived=n|}}
| {{|Land Tax Act 1710|public|1|25-11-1710|note3=|repealed=y|archived=n|}}
| {{|Lease of Exeter Castle Act 1710|public|24|25-11-1710|note3=|repealed=y|archived=n|}}
| {{|Lotteries Act 1710|public|6|25-11-1710|note3=|repealed=y|archived=n|An Act for reviving continuing and appropriating certain Duties upon several Commodities to be exported and certain Duties upon Coals to be waterborn and carried Coastwise and for granting further Duties upon Candles for Thirty two Years to raise Fifteen hundred thousand Pounds by way of a Lottery for the Service of the Year One thousand seven hundred and eleven and for suppressing such unlawful Lotteries and such Insurance Offices as are therein mentioned.}}
| {{|Militia Act 1710|public|31|25-11-1710|note3=|repealed=y|archived=n|}}
| {{|Mine Adventurers of England Act 1710|public|26|25-11-1710|note3=|repealed=y|archived=n|}}
| {{|Municipal Offices Act 1710|public|25|25-11-1710|note3=|repealed=y|archived=n|An Act for rendering the Proceedings upon Writs of Mandamus and Informations in the Nature of a Quo warranto more speedy and effectual, and for the more easy trying and determining the Rights of Offices and Franchises in Corporations and Boroughs.}}
| {{|Mutiny Act 1710|public|9|25-11-1710|note3=|repealed=y|archived=n|}}
| {{|New Churches in London and Westminster Act 1710|public|17|25-11-1710|note3=|repealed=y|archived=n|}}
| {{|Parliament Act 1710|public|5|25-11-1710|note3=|repealed=y|archived=n|}}
| {{|Post Office (Revenues) Act 1710|public|11|25-11-1710|note3=|repealed=y|archived=n|An Act for establishing a General Post Office for all Her Majesties Dominions, and for settling a weekly Sum out of the Revenues thereof for the Service of the War and other Her Majesties Occasions.}}
| {{|Preservation of Trees, America Act 1710|public|22|25-11-1710|note3=|repealed=y|archived=n|}}
| {{|Public Accounts Act 1710|public|18|25-11-1710|note3=|repealed=y|archived=n|}}
| {{|Quarantine Act 1710|public|2|25-11-1710|note3=|repealed=y|archived=n|}}
| {{|Recruiting Act 1710|public|4|25-11-1710|note3=|repealed=y|archived=n|}}
| {{|Stamps Act 1710|public|15|25-11-1710|note3=|repealed=y|archived=n|}}
| {{|Stamps Act 1710|public|16|25-11-1710|note3=|repealed=y|archived=n|}}
| {{|Taxation Act 1710|public|3|25-11-1710|note3=|repealed=y|archived=n|}}
| {{|Taxation Act 1710|public|12|25-11-1710|note3=|repealed=y|archived=n|}}
| {{|Taxation Act 1710|public|13|25-11-1710|note3=|repealed=y|archived=n|}}
| {{|Thames Fishery Act 1710|public|28|25-11-1710|note3=|repealed=y|archived=n|}}
| {{|Trade with France Act 1710|public|8|25-11-1710|note3=|repealed=y|archived=n|}}
| {{|Trade to America Act 1710|public|29|25-11-1710|note3=|repealed=y|archived=n|}}
| {{|Woollen, etc., Manufacturers Act 1710|public|32|25-11-1710|note3=|repealed=y|archived=n|}}
}}

1711 (10 Ann.)

| {{|Assise of Fuel Act 1711|public|5|07-12-1711|note3=|repealed=y|archived=n|}}
| {{|Bankrupts Act 1711|public|25|07-12-1711|note3=|repealed=y|archived=n|}}
| {{|Church Patronage (Scotland) Act 1711|public|21|07-12-1711|note3=|repealed=y|archived=n|An Act to restore the Patrons to their ancient Rights of presenting Ministers to the Churches vacant in that Part of Great Britain called Scotland.}}
| {{|Churches in London and Westminster Act 1711|public|20|07-12-1711|note3=|repealed=y|archived=n|}}
| {{|Circuits Courts Act 1711|public|40|07-12-1711|note3=|repealed=y|archived=n|}}
| {{|Continuance of Acts, 1711|public|24|07-12-1711|note3=|repealed=y|archived=n|}}
| {{|Customs and Excise Act 1711|public|19|07-12-1711|note3=|repealed=y|archived=n|}}
| {{|Debts due to the Army Act 1711|public|38|07-12-1711|note3=|repealed=y|archived=n|}}
| {{|East India Company Act 1711|public|35|07-12-1711|note3=|repealed=y|archived=n|}}
| {{|Elections (Fraudulent Conveyances) Act 1711|public|31|07-12-1711|note3=|repealed=y|archived=n|An Act for the more effectual preventing fraudulent Conveyances in order to multiply Votes for electing Knights of Shires to serve in Parliament.}}
| {{|Greenwich Hospital, etc. Act 1711|public|27|07-12-1711|note3=|repealed=y|archived=n|}}
| {{|Importation Act 1711|public|36|07-12-1711|note3=|repealed=y|archived=n|}}
| {{|Importation of Prize Goods Act 1711|public|30|07-12-1711|note3=|repealed=y|archived=n|}}
| {{|Insolvent Debtors' Relief Act 1711|public|29|07-12-1711|note3=|repealed=y|archived=n|}}
| {{|Land Tax Act 1711|public|1|07-12-1711|note3=|repealed=y|archived=n|}}
| {{|Linen Manufacture (Scotland) Act 1711|public|23|07-12-1711|note3=|repealed=y|archived=n|}}
| {{|Militia, etc. Act 1711|public|33|07-12-1711|note3=|repealed=y|archived=n|}}
| {{|Minehead Harbour Act 1711|public|32|07-12-1711|note3=|repealed=y|archived=n|}}
| {{|Mutiny Act 1711|public|13|07-12-1711|note3=|repealed=y|archived=n|}}
| {{|Naturalization Act 1711|public|9|07-12-1711|note3=|repealed=y|archived=n|}}
| {{|Oaths, Scotland Act 1711|public|39|07-12-1711|note3=|repealed=y|archived=n|}}
| {{|Pleading Act 1711|public|28|07-12-1711|note3=|repealed=y|archived=n|An Act ... for making the pleading of Deeds of Bargain and Sale enrolled and of Fee Farm Rents more easie.}}
| {{|Princess Sophia's Precedence Act 1711|public|8|07-12-1711|note3=|repealed=n|archived=n|An Act for settling the Precedence of the most Excellent Princess Sophia Electress and Dutchess Dowager of Hanover of the Elector Her Son and of the Electoral Prince the Duke of Cambridge.}}
| {{|Public Accounts Act 1711|public|11|07-12-1711|note3=|repealed=y|archived=n|}}
| {{|Recruiting Act 1711|public|12|07-12-1711|note3=|repealed=y|archived=n|}}
| {{|Scottish Episcopalians Act 1711|public|10|07-12-1711|note3=|repealed=n|archived=n|An Act to prevent the disturbing those of the Episcopal Communion in Scotland in the Exercise of their Religious Worship and in the Use of the Liturgy of the Church of England and for repealing the Act passed in the Parliament of Scotland intituled Act against irregular Baptisms and Marriages.}}
| {{|South Sea Company Act 1711|public|37|07-12-1711|note3=|repealed=y|archived=n|}}
| {{|Sufferers in the West Indies Act 1711|public|41|07-12-1711|note3=|repealed=y|archived=n|}}
| {{|Taxation Act 1711|public|7|07-12-1711|note3=|repealed=y|archived=n|}}
| {{|Taxation Act 1711|public|18|07-12-1711|note3=|repealed=y|archived=n|}}
| {{|Toleration Act 1711|note1=(also known as the Occasional Conformity Act)|public|6|07-12-1711|note3=|repealed=y|archived=n|An Act for preserving the Protestant Religion by better securing the Church of England as by Law established and for confirming the Toleration granted to Protestant Dissenters by an Act intituled An Act for exempting Their Majesties Protestant Subjects dissenting from the Church of England from the Penalties of certain Laws and for supplying the Defects thereof and for the further securing the Protestant Succession by requiring the Practicers of the Law in North Britain to take the Oaths and subscribe the Declaration therein mentioned.}}
| {{|Woollen Manufacture Act 1711|public|26|07-12-1711|note3=|repealed=y|archived=n|}}
| {{|Yule Vacance Act 1711|public|22|07-12-1711|note3=|repealed=y|archived=n|}}
}}

1712 (12 Ann.)

| {{|Exercises of Trades Act 1712|public|14|09-04-1713|note3=|repealed=y|archived=n|}}
| {{|Hackney Chairs Act 1712|public|15|09-04-1713|note3=|repealed=y|archived=n|}}
| {{|Importation Act 1712|public|9|09-04-1713|note3=|repealed=y|archived=n|}}
| {{|Land Tax Act 1712|public|1|09-04-1713|note3=|repealed=y|archived=n|}}
| {{|Militia Act 1712|public|8|09-04-1713|note3=|repealed=y|archived=n|}}
| {{|Moss Troopers Act 1712|public|10|09-04-1713|note3=|repealed=y|archived=n|}}
| {{|Mutiny Act 1712|public|13|09-04-1713|note3=|repealed=y|archived=n|}}
| {{|Parliament Act 1712|public|5|09-04-1713|note3=|repealed=y|archived=n|}}
| {{|Parliament Act 1712|public|6|09-04-1713|note3=|repealed=y|archived=n|}}
| {{|Parliament Act 1712|public|16|09-04-1713|note3=|repealed=y|archived=n|}}
| {{|Poor Act 1712|public|18|09-04-1713|note3=|repealed=y|archived=n|}}
| {{|Public Accounts Act 1712|public|3|09-04-1713|note3=|repealed=y|archived=n|}}
| {{|Public Debt Act 1712|public|11|09-04-1713|note3=|repealed=y|archived=n|}}
| {{|Parliament Act 1712|public|7|09-04-1713|note3=|repealed=y|archived=n|}}
| {{|Sail Cloth Manufacture Act 1712|public|12|09-04-1713|note3=|repealed=y|archived=n|}}
| {{|Taxation, etc. Act 1712|public|2|09-04-1713|note3=|repealed=y|archived=n|}}
| {{|West Riding Inclosures Act 1712|public|4|09-04-1713|note3=|repealed=y|archived=n|}}
}}

1713 (13 Ann.)

| {{|Duchy of Cornwall Act 1713|public|25|16-02-1714|note3=|repealed=y|archived=n|}}
| {{|Enlistment in Foreign Service Act 1713|public|10|16-02-1714|note3=|repealed=y|archived=n|}}
| {{|Equivalent Act 1713|public|12|16-02-1714|note3=|repealed=y|archived=n|}}
| {{|Established Church Act 1713|public|7|16-02-1714|note3=|repealed=y|archived=n|}}
| {{|Land Tax Act 1713|public|1|16-02-1714|note3=|repealed=y|archived=n|}}
| {{|Linen Cloth Manufacture Act 1713|public|23|16-02-1714|note3=|repealed=y|archived=n|}}
| {{|Militia, etc. Act 1713|public|9|16-02-1714|note3=|repealed=y|archived=n|}}
| {{|Mortuaries (Bangor, &c.) Abolition Act 1713|public|6|16-02-1714|note3=|repealed=y|archived=n|An Act for taking away Mortuaries within the Dioceses of Bangor, Landaff, St. David's, and St. Asaph, and giving a Recompense therefor to the Bishops of the said respective Dioceses. . . .}}
| {{|Mutiny Act 1713|public|4|16-02-1714|note3=|repealed=y|archived=n|}}
| {{|Presentation of Benefices Act 1713|public|13|16-02-1714|note3=|repealed=y|archived=n|}}
| {{|Repair of Breach in Thames Bank at Dagenham: Coal Duties Act 1713|public|20|16-02-1714|note3=|repealed=y|archived=n|}}
| {{|Simony Act 1713|public|11|16-02-1714|note3=|repealed=y|archived=n|An Act for the better Maintenance of Curates within the Church of England within the Church of England, and for preventing any Ecclesiastical Persons from buying the next Avoidance of any Church Preferment.}}
| {{|Stamps Act 1713|public|18|16-02-1714|note3=|repealed=y|archived=n|}}
| {{|Stranded Ships Act 1713|public|21|16-02-1714|note3=|repealed=y|archived=n|}}
| {{|Taxation Act 1713|public|3|16-02-1714|note3=|repealed=y|archived=n|}}
| {{|Taxation Act 1713|public|5|16-02-1714|note3=|repealed=y|archived=n|}}
| {{|Taxation Act 1713|public|22|16-02-1714|note3=|repealed=y|archived=n|}}
| {{|Taxation Act 1713|public|24|16-02-1714|note3=|repealed=y|archived=n|}}
| {{|Taxation, etc. Act 1713|public|2|16-02-1714|note3=|repealed=y|archived=n|}}
| {{|Tobacco Trade Act 1713|public|8|16-02-1714|note3=|repealed=y|archived=n|}}
| {{|Usury Act 1713|public|15|16-02-1714|note3=|repealed=y|archived=n|}}
| {{|Vagrants Act 1713|public|26|16-02-1714|note3=|repealed=y|archived=n|}}
}}

1714

1 Geo. 1 St. 1

| {{|National Debt Act 1714|public|2|01-08-1714|note3=|repealed=y|archived=n|An Act for rectifying mistakes in the names of the commissioners for the land-tax for the year one thousand seven hundred and fourteen; and for raising so much as is wanting to make up the sum of fourteen hundred thousand pounds, intended to be raised by a lottery for the publick service in the said year.}}
| {{|Oaths, etc. Act 1714|public|3|01-08-1714|note3=|repealed=y|archived=n|An Act to enable persons now residing in Great Britain, to take the oaths, and do all other acts in Great Britain, requisite to qualify themselves to continue their respective places, offices and employments in Ireland.}}
}}

1715 (1 Geo. 1 St. 2)

| {{|Attainder of Viscount Bolingbroke Act 1714|public|16|17-03-1715|note3=|repealed=y|archived=n|An act for the attainder of Henry viscount Bolingbroke of high treafon, unless he shall render himself to justice by a day certain therein mentioned.}}
| {{|Building of Churches, London and Westminster Act 1714|public|23|17-03-1715|note3=|repealed=y|archived=n|}}
| {{|Continuance of Laws, etc. Act 1714|public|26|17-03-1715|note3=|repealed=y|archived=n|}}
| {{|Debts Due to the Army Act 1714|public|24|17-03-1715|note3=|repealed=y|archived=n|}}
| {{|Equivalent Act 1714|public|27|17-03-1715|note3=|repealed=y|archived=n|An act for taking and stating the debts due and growing due to Scotland by way of equivalent in the terms of the union; and for relief of the creditors of the publick in Scotland, and the commissioners of the equivalent.}}
| {{|Fish Act 1714|public|18|17-03-1715|note3=|repealed=y|archived=n|An act for the better preventing fresh fish taken by foreigners being imported into this kingdom, and for the preservation of the fry of fish; and for the giving leave to import lobsters and turbets in foreign bottoms, and for the better preservation of salmon within several rivers in that part of this kingdom called England.}}
| {{|Foreign Protestants Naturalization Act 1714|public|29|17-03-1715|note3=|repealed=y|archived=n|An act for allowing a time for two hundred and thirteen families of protestant Palatines, now settled in Ireland, to take the oaths, in order to intitle them to all the benefits intended them by the act of the seventh year of her late Majesty's reign, for naturalizing foreign protestants.}}
| {{|Habeas Corpus Suspension, etc. Act 1714|public|8|17-03-1715|note3=|repealed=y|archived=n|An Act to impower his Majesty to secure and detain such persons as his Majesty shall suspect are conspiring against his person and government.}}
| {{|Highways Act 1714|public|11|17-03-1715|note3=|repealed=y|archived=n|An Act to refrain all waggoners, carriers, and others, for drawing any carriage with more than five horses in length.}}
| {{|Imprisonment of Certain Traitors Act 1714|public|7|17-03-1715|note3=|repealed=y|archived=n|An Act for continuing the imprisonment of Robert Blackburn and others, for the horrid conspiracy to assassinate the person of his late sacred Majesty King William the Third.}}
| {{|Land Tax Act 1714|public|1|17-03-1715|note3=|repealed=y|archived=n|An act for granting an aid to his Majesty, to be raised by a land-tax in Great-Britain, for the service of the year one thousand seven hundred and fifteen.}}
| {{|Malt Duties, etc. Act 1714|public|2|17-03-1715|note3=|repealed=y|archived=n|An Act for charging and continuing the duties on malt, mum, cyder and perry, for the service of the year one thousand seven hundred and fifteen; and for making forth duplicates of Exchequer-bills, and lottery-tickets, lost, burnt, or destroyed; and for enlarging the time for adjusting claims in several lotteries; and for making forth new orders in lieu of certain lottery-orders obliterated or defective; and for continuing certain duties on hops, until the first day of August one thousand seven hundred and fifteen.}}
| {{|Militia Act 1714|public|14|17-03-1715|note3=|repealed=y|archived=n|}}
| {{|Mutiny Act 1714|public|3|17-03-1715|note3=|repealed=y|archived=n|An act for the better regulating the forces to be continued in his Majesty's service, and for the payment of the said forces, and of their quarters.}}
| {{|Mutiny Act 1714|public|9|17-03-1715|note3=|repealed=y|archived=n|}}
| {{|National Debt Act 1714|public|12|17-03-1715|note3=|repealed=y|archived=n|An act for enlarging the fund of the governor and company of the ban of England, relating to Exchequer bills; and for settling an additional revenue of one hundred and twenty thousand pounds per annum upon his Majesty during his life, for the service of the civil government; and for establishing a certain fund of fifty four thousand six hundred pounds per annum, in order to raise a sum not exceeding nine hundred and ten thousand pounds for the service of the publick, by sale of annuities, after the rate of six pounds per centum per annum, redeemable by parliament; and for satisfying an arrear for work and materials at Blenheim, incurred whilst that building was carried on at the expence of her late majesty Queen Anne, of blessed memory; and for other purposes therein mentioned.}}
| {{|National Debt Act 1714|public|19|17-03-1715|note3=|repealed=y|archived=n|}}
| {{|National Debt Act 1714|public|21|17-03-1715|note3=|repealed=y|archived=n|}}
| {{|Naturalization Act 1714|public|4|17-03-1715|note3=|repealed=y|archived=n|An act to explain the act made in the twelfth year of the reign of King William the Third, intituled An act for the further limitation of the crown, and better securing the rights and liberties of the subject.}}
| {{|Navy, etc. Act 1714|public|25|17-03-1715|note3=|repealed=y|archived=n|}}
| {{|Provision for Princess of Wales Act 1714|public|22|17-03-1715|note3=|repealed=y|archived=n|}}
| {{|Queen Anne's Bounty Act 1714|public|10|17-03-1715|note3=|repealed=y|archived=n|An Act for making more effectual her late Majesty's gracious intentions for augmenting the maintenance of the poor clergy.}}
| {{|Riot Act|public|5|17-03-1715|note3=|repealed=y|archived=n|An Act for preventing tumults and riotous assemblies, and for the more speedy and effectual punishing the rioters.}}
| {{|Security of the Sovereign Act 1714|public|13|17-03-1715|note3=|repealed=y|archived=n|}}
| {{|Tithes and Church Rates Recovery Act 1714|note1=|public|6|17-03-1715|note3=|repealed=y|archived=n|An Act for making perpetual an act of the seventh and eighth years of the reign of his late majesty King William the Third, intituled, An act that the solemn affirmation and declaration of the people called Quakers, shall be accepted instead of an oath in the usual form; and for explaining and enforcing the said act in relation to the payment of tithes and church rates; and for appointing the form of an affirmation to be taken by the said people called Quakers, instead of the oath of abjuration.}}
| {{|Treason in Scotland Act 1714|public|20|17-03-1715|note3=|repealed=y|archived=n|}}
| {{|Woollen Manufacture Act 1714|public|15|17-03-1715|note3=|repealed=y|archived=n|}}
| {{|Yule Vacance Act 1714|public|28|17-03-1715|note3=|repealed=y|archived=n|An act for repealing an act, intituled, An act for repealing part of an act passed in the parliament of Scotland, intituled, Act for discharging the Yule vacance.}}
| {{|Assizes for Cornwall Act 1715|public|45|17-03-1715|note3=|repealed=y|archived=n|An Act for redeeming several Funds of the Governor and Company of the Bank of England, pursuant to former Provisoes of Redemption … ; and for other Purposes in this Act mentioned.}}
| {{|Attainder of Earl of Mar and others Act 1715|public|32|17-03-1715|note3=|repealed=y|archived=n|}}
| {{|Attainder of Earl of Marischal and others Act 1715|public|42|17-03-1715|note3=|repealed=y|archived=n|}}
| {{|Attainder of Thomas Forster and others Act 1715|public|53|17-03-1715|note3=|repealed=y|archived=n|}}
| {{|Bridlington Pier Act 1715|public|49|17-03-1715|note3=|repealed=y|archived=n|}}
| {{|Crown Lands (Forfeited Estates) Act 1715|public|50|17-03-1715|note3=|repealed=y|archived=n|}}
| {{|Crown Pensioners Disqualification Act 1715|note1=|public|56|17-03-1715|note3=|repealed=y|archived=n|}}
| {{|Debts Due to the Army Act 1715|public|35|17-03-1715|note3=|repealed=y|archived=n|}}
| {{|Duchy of Cornwall Act 1715|public|37|17-03-1715|note3=|repealed=y|archived=n|}}
| {{|Glasgow Beer Duties Act 1715|public|44|17-03-1715|note3=|repealed=y|archived=n|}}
| {{|Habeas Corpus Suspension Act 1715|public|30|17-03-1715|note3=|repealed=y|archived=n|}}
| {{|Hackney Coaches, etc. Act 1715|public|57|17-03-1715|note3=|repealed=y|archived=n|}}
| {{|Highlands Services Act 1715|note1=Sometimes called the Highland Services Act 1715.|public|54|17-03-1715|note3=|repealed=y|archived=n|}}
| {{|Highways Act 1715|public|52|17-03-1715|note3=|repealed=y|archived=n|}}
| {{|Importation Act 1715|public|40|17-03-1715|note3=|repealed=y|archived=n|}}
| {{|Indemnity Act 1715|public|39|17-03-1715|note3=|repealed=y|archived=n|}}
| {{|Land Tax Act 1715|public|31|17-03-1715|note3=|repealed=y|archived=n|}}
| {{|Mutiny Act 1715|public|34|17-03-1715|note3=|repealed=y|archived=n|}}
| {{|Papists Act 1715|public|55|17-03-1715|note3=|repealed=y|archived=n|}}
| {{|Persuading Soldiers to Desert, etc. Act 1715|public|47|17-03-1715|note3=|repealed=y|archived=n|}}
| {{|Preservation of Timber Trees Act 1715|public|48|17-03-1715|note3=|repealed=y|archived=n|}}
| {{|Septennial Act 1715|public|38|17-03-1715|note3=|repealed=y|archived=n|}}
| {{|Sovereign's Power to go Abroad (Restriction Repeated) Act 1715|public|51|17-03-1715|note3=|repealed=y|archived=n|}}
| {{|Taxation Act 1715|public|43|17-03-1715|note3=|repealed=y|archived=n|}}
| {{|Taxation, etc. Act 1715|public|36|17-03-1715|note3=|repealed=y|archived=n|}}
| {{|Tobacco Act 1715|public|46|17-03-1715|note3=|repealed=y|archived=n|}}
| {{|Trial of Rebels Act 1715|public|33|17-03-1715|note3=|repealed=y|archived=n|}}
| {{|Woollen Manufacture Act 1715|public|41|17-03-1715|note3=|repealed=y|archived=n|}}
}}

1716 (3 Geo. 1)

| {{|Bankruptcy Act 1716|public|12|20-02-1717|note3=|repealed=y|archived=n}}
| {{|Commerce with Sweden Act 1716|public|1|20-02-1717|note3=|repealed=y|archived=n}}
| {{|Debts Due to the Army Act 1716|public|17|20-02-1717|note3=|repealed=y|archived=n}}
| {{|Dumfries Beer Duties Act 1716|public|6|20-02-1717|note3=|repealed=y|archived=n}}
| {{|Edinburgh Beer Duties Act 1716|public|5|20-02-1717|note3=|repealed=y|archived=n}}
| {{|Equivalent Act 1716|public|14|20-02-1717|note3=|repealed=y|archived=n}}
| {{|Estreats Act 1716|note1=|public|15|20-02-1717|note3=|repealed=y|archived=n}}
| {{|Exportation, etc. Act 1716|public|21|20-02-1717|note3=|repealed=y|archived=n}}
| {{|Forfeited Estates (Time for Claims) Act 1716|public|20|20-02-1717|note3=|repealed=y|archived=n}}
| {{|Game Act 1716|public|11|20-02-1717|note3=|repealed=y|archived=n}}
| {{|General Pardon Act 1716|public|19|20-02-1717|note3=|repealed=y|archived=n}}
| {{|Land Tax Act 1716|public|3|20-02-1717|note3=|repealed=y|archived=n}}
| {{|Mutiny Act 1716|public|2|20-02-1717|note3=|repealed=y|archived=n}}
| {{|National Debt Act 1716|public|7|20-02-1717|note3=|repealed=y|archived=n}}
| {{|National Debt Act 1716|public|9|20-02-1717|note3=|repealed=y|archived=n}}
| {{|Papists Act 1716|public|18|20-02-1717|note3=|repealed=y|archived=n}}
| {{|Pilotage Act 1716|public|13|20-02-1717|note3=|repealed=y|archived=n}}
| {{|Queen Anne's Bounty Act 1716|note1=|public|10|20-02-1717|note3=|repealed=y|archived=n|An Act for making more effectual her late Majesties gracious Intention for augmenting the Maintenance of the Poor Clergy.}}
| {{|Sheriffs Act 1716|public|16|20-02-1717|note3=|repealed=y|archived=n}}
| {{|Taxation Act 1716|public|4|20-02-1717|note3=|repealed=y|archived=n}}
}}

1717 (4 Geo. 1)

| {{|Debts Due to the Army, etc. Act 1717|public|9|21-11-1717|note3=|repealed=y|archived=n|}}
| {{|Dover Harbour Act 1717|public|13|21-11-1717|note3=|repealed=y|archived=n|}}
| {{|Hawkers Act 1717|public|6|21-11-1717|note3=|repealed=y|archived=n|}}
| {{|Land Tax Act 1717|public|1|21-11-1717|note3=|repealed=y|archived=n|}}
| {{|Mutiny Act 1717|public|4|21-11-1717|note3=|repealed=y|archived=n|}}
| {{|National Debt Act 1717|public|10|21-11-1717|note3=|repealed=y|archived=n|}}
| {{|Piracy Act 1717|public|11|21-11-1717|note3=|repealed=y|archived=n|}}
| {{|Saint Giles in the Fields: Rebuilding Act 1717|public|14|21-11-1717|note3=|repealed=y|archived=n|}}
| {{|Saint Michael, Cornhill: Building Act 1717|public|5|21-11-1717|note3=|repealed=y|archived=n|}}
| {{|Silk Manufacturers Act 1717|public|7|21-11-1717|note3=|repealed=y|archived=n|}}
| {{|South Sea Company Act 1717|public|2|21-11-1717|note3=|repealed=y|archived=n|}}
| {{|Stranded Ships, etc. Act 1717|public|12|21-11-1717|note3=|repealed=y|archived=n|}}
| {{|Taxation, etc. Act 1717|public|3|21-11-1717|note3=|repealed=y|archived=n|}}
| {{|Indemnity Act 1717|public|15|21-11-1717|note3=|repealed=y|archived=n|}}
}}

1718 (5 Geo. 1)

| {{|Artificers Act 1718|public|27|11-11-1718|note3=|repealed=y|archived=n|}}
| {{|Bankrupts Act 1718|public|24|11-11-1718|note3=|repealed=y|archived=n|}}
| {{|Bridlington Piers Act 1718|public|10|11-11-1718|note3=|repealed=y|archived=n|}}
| {{|Church Patronage (Scotland) Act 1718|note1=|public|29|11-11-1718|note3=|repealed=y|archived=n|}}
| {{|Colne River, Essex: Navigation Act 1718|public|31|11-11-1718|note3=|repealed=y|archived=n|}}
| {{|Continuance of Acts, 1718|public|25|11-11-1718|note3=|repealed=y|archived=n|}}
| {{|Corporations Act 1718|public|6|11-11-1718|note3=|repealed=y|archived=n|}}
| {{|Crown Lands – Forfeited Estates Act 1718|public|22|11-11-1718|note3=|repealed=y|archived=n|}}
| {{|Debts Due to the Army, etc. Act 1718|public|14|11-11-1718|note3=|repealed=y|archived=n|}}
| {{|Deer Stealers Act 1718|public|15|11-11-1718|note3=|repealed=y|archived=n|}}
| {{|Destruction of Deer (England) Act 1718|public|28|11-11-1718|note3=|repealed=y|archived=n|}}
| {{|Dunbar Beer Duties Act 1718|public|16|11-11-1718|note3=|repealed=y|archived=n|}}
| {{|Forfeited Estates, etc. Act 1718|public|23|11-11-1718|note3=|repealed=y|archived=n|}}
| {{|Highway (Scotland) Act 1718|note1=|public|30|11-11-1718|note3=|repealed=y|archived=n|}}
| {{|Highways Act 1718|public|12|11-11-1718|note3=|repealed=y|archived=n|}}
| {{|Inverness Beer Duties Act 1718|public|17|11-11-1718|note3=|repealed=y|archived=n|}}
| {{|Keeping of Gunpowder Act 1718|public|26|11-11-1718|note3=|repealed=y|archived=n|}}
| {{|Land Tax Act 1718|public|1|11-11-1718|note3=|repealed=y|archived=n|}}
| {{|Mutiny Act 1718|public|5|11-11-1718|note3=|repealed=y|archived=n|}}
| {{|National Debt Act 1718|public|3|11-11-1718|note3=|repealed=y|archived=n|}}
| {{|National Debt Act 1718|public|9|11-11-1718|note3=|repealed=y|archived=n|}}
| {{|National Debt Act 1718|public|19|11-11-1718|note3=|repealed=y|archived=n|}}
| {{|Poor Relief (Deserted Wives and Children) Act 1718|note1=|public|8|11-11-1718|note3=|repealed=y|archived=n|}}
| {{|Relief of Sufferers, West Indies Act 1718|public|32|11-11-1718|note3=|repealed=y|archived=n|}}
| {{|Religious Worship Act 1718|public|4|11-11-1718|note3=|repealed=y|archived=n|}}
| {{|Revenue of Scotland Act 1718|note1=|public|20|11-11-1718|note3=|repealed=y|archived=n|}}
| {{|Salt Duties Act 1718|public|18|11-11-1718|note3=|repealed=y|archived=n|}}
| {{|Taxation, etc. Act 1718|public|2|11-11-1718|note3=|repealed=y|archived=n|}}
| {{|Tobacco Trade Act 1718|public|7|11-11-1718|note3=|repealed=y|archived=n|}}
| {{|Trade to the East Indies Act 1718|public|21|11-11-1718|note3=|repealed=y|archived=n|}}
| {{|Writs of Error Act 1718|public|13|11-11-1718|note3=|repealed=y|archived=n|}}
}}

1719 (6 Geo. 1)

| {{|Crown Lands – Forfeited Estates Act 1719|public|24|23-11-1719|note3=|repealed=y|archived=n|}}
| {{|Customs Act 1719|public|12|23-11-1719|note3=|repealed=y|archived=n|}}
| {{|Debts Due to the Army, etc. Act 1719|public|17|23-11-1719|note3=|repealed=y|archived=n|}}
| {{|Dependency of Ireland on Great Britain Act 1719|public|5|23-11-1719|note3=|repealed=y|archived=n|An Act for the better securing the dependency of the Kingdom of Ireland on the Crown of Great Britain.}}
| {{|Excessive Loading of Vehicles, London and Westminster Act 1719|public|6|23-11-1719|note3=|repealed=y|archived=n|}}
| {{|Excise Act 1719|public|21|23-11-1719|note3=|repealed=y|archived=n|}}
| {{|Hertfordshire Highways Act 1719|public|20|23-11-1719|note3=|repealed=y|archived=n|}}
| {{|Importation Act 1719|public|14|23-11-1719|note3=|repealed=y|archived=n|}}
| {{|Importation Act 1719|public|15|23-11-1719|note3=|repealed=y|archived=n|}}
| {{|Insolvent Debtors' Relief, etc. Act 1719|public|22|23-11-1719|note3=|repealed=y|archived=n|}}
| {{|Land Tax Act 1719|public|1|23-11-1719|note3=|repealed=y|archived=n|}}
| {{|Manufacture of Serges, etc. Act 1719|public|13|23-11-1719|note3=|repealed=y|archived=n|}}
| {{|Montrose Beer Duties Act 1719|public|7|23-11-1719|note3=|repealed=y|archived=n|}}
| {{|Mutiny Act 1719|public|3|23-11-1719|note3=|repealed=y|archived=n|}}
| {{|National Debt Act 1719|public|4|23-11-1719|note3=|repealed=y|archived=n|}}
| {{|National Debt Act 1719|public|10|23-11-1719|note3=|repealed=y|archived=n|}}
| {{|Perpetuation of Acts, etc., 1719|public|19|23-11-1719|note3=|repealed=y|archived=n|}}
| {{|Pittenweem Beer Duties Act 1719|public|9|23-11-1719|note3=|repealed=y|archived=n|}}
| {{|Plate Duty Act 1719|note1=|public|11|23-11-1719|note3=|repealed=y|archived=n|}}
| {{|Preservation of Timber Trees, etc. (Scotland) Act 1719|public|16|23-11-1719|note3=|repealed=y|archived=n|}}
| {{|River Darwent, Derby: Navigation Act 1719|public|27|23-11-1719|note3=|repealed=y|archived=n|}}
| {{|River Douglas, Wigan: Navigation Act 1719|public|28|23-11-1719|note3=|repealed=y|archived=n|}}
| {{|River Idle, Nottinghamshire: Navigation Act 1719|public|30|23-11-1719|note3=|repealed=y|archived=n|}}
| {{|River Ouse, Huntingdonshire: Navigation Act 1719|public|29|23-11-1719|note3=|repealed=y|archived=n|}}
| {{|Robbery, etc. Act 1719|public|23|23-11-1719|note3=|repealed=y|archived=n|}}
| {{|Royal Exchange and London Assurance Corporation Act 1719|note1=(commonly known as the Bubble Act)|public|18|23-11-1719|note3=|repealed=y|archived=n|An Act for better securing certain Powers and Privileges intended to be granted by His Majesty by Two Charters for Assurance of Ships and Merchandizes at Sea, and for lending Money on Bottomry; and for restraining several extravagant and unwarrantable Practices therein mentioned.}}
| {{|Stevenage and Biggleswade Road Act 1719|public|25|23-11-1719|note3=|repealed=y|archived=n|}}
| {{|Surrey and Kent Roads. Act 1719|public|26|23-11-1719|note3=|repealed=y|archived=n|}}
| {{|Taxation, etc. Act 1719|public|2|23-11-1719|note3=|repealed=y|archived=n|}}
}}

See also
List of Acts of the Parliament of Great Britain

References
Chronological Table of and Index to the Statutes. Thirteenth Edition. Printed for HMSO. London. 1896. Volume 1. Pages 86 to 95.

External links
The Statutes at Large
- Volume 11 - 2 Anne to 8 Anne - 1703 to 1709 - also
- Volume 12 - 8 Anne to 12 Anne - 1709 to 1712
- Volume 13 - 12 Anne to 5 George I - 1712 to 1718-9 - also - also
- Volume 14 - 5 George I to 9 George I - 1718-9 to 1722-3 - also

1707
1700s in Great Britain
1710s in Great Britain